The Old Thatch series is a book series by Enid Blyton. The first book, The Talking Teapot and Other Tales, appeared in 1934.

References

Enid Blyton series